James M. Holtgrieve (born December 26, 1947) is an American amateur golfer who had a brief professional career.

Holtgrieve was born in St. Louis, Missouri. He attended the University of Missouri and Washburn University.

Holtgrieve had the most success as an amateur golfer, winning the inaugural U.S. Mid-Amateur in 1981, finishing runner-up in the 1983 British Amateur, and losing in the semi-finals of the 1980 U.S. Amateur. He played on three winning Walker Cup teams (1979, 1981, and 1983) and captained the U.S. team in 2011 and 2013. He played on the winning U.S. team in the Eisenhower Trophy in 1980 and 1982.

Holtgrieve turned professional in 1998 and began playing on the Champions Tour. His best finish on tour was a T-2nd at The Home Depot Invitational in 1999.

Holtgrieve had his amateur status reinstated by the USGA in 2007.

Results in major championships

Note: Holtgrieve only played in the Masters and the U.S. Open.

CUT = missed the half-way cut
"T" = tied

U.S. national team appearances
Amateur
Walker Cup: 1979 (winners), 1981 (winners), 1983 (winners), 2011 (non-playing captain), 2013 (non-playing captain)
Eisenhower Trophy: 1980 (winners), 1982 (winners)

References

External links

2002 U.S. Senior Open profile

American male golfers
Amateur golfers
PGA Tour Champions golfers
Golfers from St. Louis
University of Missouri alumni
Washburn University alumni
1947 births
Living people